Korsun is an urban-type settlement in Yenakiieve Municipality (district) in Donetsk Oblast of eastern Ukraine. Population:

Demographics
Native language as of the Ukrainian Census of 2001:
 Ukrainian 40.13%
 Russian 59.35%
 Armenian 0.29%
 Belarusian 0.06%

References

Urban-type settlements in Horlivka Raion